Peter Carter (9 August 1964 – 1 August 2002) was an Australian tennis player and coach. He is widely known as the first and most influential coach of Roger Federer.

Playing career
Carter won the 1985 Melbourne Tennis Tournament with Darren Cahill. He reached a career high of 173 in singles and 117 in doubles on the ATP, but his career was hampered by injuries.

Coaching career
Carter is widely known particularly as the coach of tennis champion Roger Federer. He met Federer when he was 9 and quickly identified him as a future world no 1. Federer has said that “Peter was an incredibly inspirational and important person in my life. He taught me respect for each person. I can never thank him enough.”

Federer won his first Grand Slam event the year following Carter’s death at the 2003 Wimbledon Championships.

Death
Carter died in a car accident on 1 August, 2002 while on a belated honeymoon to Kruger National Park in South Africa (his wife Sylvia had been recovering from Hodgkin's disease). Carter was in a vehicle which swerved off the road to avoid a head-on collision with a minivan.

Career finals

Doubles (1 titles)

References

External links
 
 

1974 births
2002 deaths
Australian male tennis players
Australian tennis coaches
Roger Federer
Tennis players from Adelaide
Road incident deaths in South Africa